Pedro Martínez Cami (born 20 December 1999) is an Argentine handball player. He competed in the 2020 Summer Olympics.

References

1999 births
Living people
Handball players at the 2020 Summer Olympics
Argentine male handball players
Olympic handball players of Argentina
21st-century Argentine people
South American Games gold medalists for Argentina
South American Games medalists in handball
Competitors at the 2022 South American Games